Alexander Sergeyevich Golovin (born 26 March 1983) is a Russian professional ice hockey winger, born in Kazakh SSR, who currently plays for PKH Gdańsk in the Polska Hokej Liga (PHL).

Career 
Golovin was selected by the Chicago Blackhawks in the sixth round (174th overall) of the 2001 NHL Entry Draft. He previously played in the Russian Superleague and Kontinental Hockey League for Avangard Omsk, HC Sibir Novosibirsk, Ak Bars Kazan, SKA Saint Petersburg, Metallurg Novokuznetsk, HC Spartak Moscow, HC Yugra and Avtomobilist Yekaterinburg. He also played in Asia League Ice Hockey for Sakhalin.

Career statistics

Regular season and playoffs

International

References

External links

1983 births
Living people
Ak Bars Kazan players
Avangard Omsk players
Avtomobilist Yekaterinburg players
Chicago Blackhawks draft picks
HSC Csíkszereda players
Metallurg Novokuznetsk players
Orlik Opole players
Sportspeople from Oskemen
Russian ice hockey left wingers
PSK Sakhalin players
SKA Saint Petersburg players
Saryarka Karagandy players
HC Sibir Novosibirsk players
HC Spartak Moscow players
Sputnik Nizhny Tagil players
Stoczniowiec Gdańsk players
HC Yugra players
Zauralie Kurgan players
Russian expatriate ice hockey people
Russian expatriate sportspeople in Poland
Expatriate ice hockey players in Poland
Russian expatriate sportspeople in Romania
Expatriate ice hockey players in Romania